The Chambo River is a tributary of the Pastaza River in Ecuador. The Chambo rises on the Central Cordillera. The Chambo runs across the Province of Chimborazo, and eventually joins with the Patate River in the Province of Tungurahua, near Tungurahua. Chambo, a town along its path, was named after the river.

Rivers of Ecuador